Glen Smidt (born 4 December 1963) is a New Zealand cricketer. He played in two List A matches for Central Districts in 1986/87.

See also
 List of Central Districts representative cricketers

References

External links
 

1963 births
Living people
New Zealand cricketers
Central Districts cricketers
Cricketers from Napier, New Zealand